The Acereros de Monclova (English: Monclova Steelers) are a professional baseball team in the Mexican League based in Monclova, Coahuila, Mexico. Their home ballpark is Estadio de Béisbol Monclova, which has a capacity of 11,000 people. The Acereros replaced the Mineros de Coahuila in the 1976 season.

History 
Officially named the Acereros del Norte (Steelers of the North), the Acereros de Monclova (Monclova Steelers) debuted in the Mexican League on March 23, 1974, as the Mineros de Coahuila (Miners of Coahuila) against the Indios de Ciudad Juárez at "Sports Park Ahmsa". They were managed by "Sergeant Shrapnel" Tomás Herrera. The team moved into Monclova Stadium on March 16, 1975, with a game between the Mineros and the Alijadores de Tampico. The team reached the playoffs for the first time in 1976, but were eliminated by Juárez.

In 1980, the team changed their name to Acereros de Monclova and were led by manager Victor Favela. They advanced to the postseason by virtue of finishing in third place in the Northern Zone, but lost 4–0 to the Tecolotes de los Dos Laredos.

The 1986 Steelers set a record for runs scored with 203, matching also their record most home runs hit in a game. They finished the regular season as the leader of the North Division with a 76–51 record, with a five-game lead over the Sultanes de Monterrey. However, after winning in six games in the first round of the playoffs over Dos Laredos, they fell in the North Division Championship Series to the Sultanes in seven games. In 1987, Monclova defeated Monterrey in five games, but were then defeated in five games by the Tecolotes. Monclova was defeated by the Tecolotes again in the first round of the 1990 playoffs.

Northern Steel Group purchased the team in 1992 and rebranded it as the Acereros del Norte. They took third place in 1993, but fell in five games to Monterrey in the first round. The Acereros returned to the playoffs in 1996, but lost to Monterrey, 4–2, in the first round. Monclova set the attendance record for all of the Mexican League in 1997. In the playoffs, they lost to the Olmecas de Tabasco in four games.

In 1998, the Steelers made it to the championship finals for the first time in 24 years. They were managed by Aurelio Rodriguez, and included players such as Jesus "Chito" Ríos, Juan Manuel Palafox, Boi Rodriguez, Luis Raven. In that postseason, Monclova beat the Langosteros de Cancún and then went on to defeat the Tigres Capitalinos in seven games. In the final round, they were swept by the Guerreros de Oaxaca in four games. They returned to the postseason in 1999, beating Cancun in the first round, but losing to the Tigres, 4–2, in the second round. They won the first round in 2001 against the Broncos de Reynosa in six games, but lost second round to the Diablos Rojos del México, 4–2.

The Acereros did not return to the playoffs until 2007 where they were defeated by Monterrey in seven games. They finished the 2008 season in first place. They went on to win the first round against the Dorados de Chihuahua in seven games, but lost the next round to Monterrey in four games.

In February 2017, the grandson of founder Harold Pape, Gerardo Benavides Pape, purchased the team bringing it back to family ownership.

Stadium 

The Acereros home stadium is Monclova Stadium, located in Monclova, Coahuila, Mexico. It has natural grass surface and capacity for 11,000 people. It was inaugurated on March 16, 1975, and remodeled and enlarged in 1996.

Roster

Retired Numbers

References

External links
 

Sports teams in Coahuila
Baseball teams established in 1974
Mexican League teams
1974 establishments in Mexico